The 2017 GP Industria & Artigianato di Larciano was the 49th edition of the GP Industria & Artigianato di Larciano road cycling one day race. It was held on 5 March 2017 as part of UCI Europe Tour in category 1.HC.

Teams
Nineteen teams of up to eight riders started the race:

Result

References

2017 UCI Europe Tour
2017 in Italian sport
GP Industria & Artigianato di Larciano